Tepetlixpa is a municipality in Mexico State in Mexico.

As of 2000, the municipality had a total population of 16,871.

Nepantla de Sor Juana Inés de la Cruz
The municipality is home to Nepantla de Sor Juana Inés de la Cruz, formerly known as San Miguel Nepantla, the hometown of Sor Juana Inés de la Cruz. 

At his request, the ashes of Argentine-Mexican poet Juan Gelman were scattered in Nepantla.

References

Municipalities of the State of Mexico
Populated places in the State of Mexico